Ysgol Aberconwy is a medium-sized, mixed comprehensive school for ages 11 to 18, on the Conwy estuary on the North Wales coast. The school is two minutes from the A55 Expressway linking Chester to North Wales.

Ian Gerrard BSc was appointed headteacher at the beginning of the 2014–15 academic year. Pupils are divided into four houses, each with a corresponding colour on the uniform: Crafnant-green, Hiraethlyn-blue, Dulyn-yellow, Llugwy-red

Curriculum 
English, Welsh, Maths, Science, Religious Education and Physical Education are compulsory until the end of Year 11. All other subjects are optional after Year 9. Pupils Welsh Bacc, begin their GCSE studies at the beginning of Year 10.

Whilst Ysgol Aberconwy does not offer any specialist subjects, pupils in Years 10–13 may study courses at Llandrillo College, such as Retail Management, Catering, Fine Art, Graphic Art, Health and Beauty, Fashion and Textiles, Photography, Applied IT, Further Maths, Human Biology, and Geology.

Uniform 
The school uniform for the lower school (years 7 to 11) is a dark navy sweater with the school crest, a white polo neck shirt with a collar in the colour of the pupil's house, black trousers or skirt, and dark shoes.
The Sixth Form uniform consists of a grey V-neck jumper with the school crest, a white collared shirt and a blue and gold tie, dark trousers or skirt and plain black shoes.

Sports Centre 
The school buildings include a sports centre with a sports hall, climbing wall and AstroTurf football pitch.

Notable former pupils

 Paula Yates - deceased television presenter

References

External links

Ysgol Aberconwy
Educational institutions established in 1960
Ysgol Aberconwy
1960 establishments in Wales